Shaw Lefevre was a double-barrelled surname created in 1789 through the marriage of Charles Shaw and Helena Lefevre. It was never hyphenated. The surname was held by a total of 24 people, and became extinct in 1936.

The name was held by a number of prominent people, including:

Charles Shaw Lefevre (politician) (1759–1823), born Charles Shaw, British Whig politician
Charles Shaw Lefevre, 1st Viscount Eversley (1794–1888), Speaker of the House of Commons, son of Charles Shaw Lefevre (MP)
John Shaw Lefevre (1797–1879), British politician and civil servant, son of Charles Shaw Lefevre (MP)
George Shaw Lefevre, 1st Baron Eversley (1831–1928), British Liberal Party politician, son of John Shaw Lefevre
Madeleine Shaw Lefevre (1835–1914), first Principal of Somerville Hall (later Somerville College, Oxford), daughter of John Shaw Lefevre

References